Marquess of Silvela is a hereditary title of nobility in the Peerage of Spain accompanied by the dignity of Grandee. It was bestowed by Alfonso XIII on Amalia Loring, in memory of her late husband, Francisco Silvela, who was Prime Minister of Spain.

Marquesses of Silvela (1915) 
Amalia Loring y Heredia, 1st Marchioness of Silvela
Jorge Silvela y Loring, 2nd Marquess of Silvela
Francisco Silvela y Montero de Espinosa, 3rd Marquess of Silvela
Jorge Silvela y Barcáiztegui, 4th Marquess of Silvela
Victoria Silvela y Faget, 5th Marchioness of Silvela

See also
List of grandees of Spain

References

Bibliography

 

Spanish noble titles
Marquesses of Spain